984 Gretia  is a stony background asteroid from the central regions of the asteroid belt, approximately  in diameter. It was discovered by German astronomer Karl Reinmuth at the Heidelberg-Königstuhl State Observatory on 27 August 1922 and given the provisional designation . The asteroid was named after Greta, sister-in-law of ARI-astronomer Albrecht Kahrstedt.

Orbit and classification 

Gretia is a background asteroid that has not been associated with any known asteroid family. It orbits the Sun in the central main belt at a distance of 2.2–3.4 AU once every 4 years and 8 months (1,714 days). Its orbit has an eccentricity of 0.20 and an inclination of 9° with respect to the ecliptic.

The body's observation arc begins at Vienna Observatory in September 1922, two weeks after its official discovery observation.

Naming 

This minor planet was named after Greta, sister-in-law of Albrecht Kahrstedt (1897–1971), a German astronomer at ARI and director of the institute's Potsdam division, who requested the naming of this asteroid and 1026 Ingrid (daughter of Greta) in a personal letter to the discoverer in February 1926.

The official naming citation was mentioned in The Names of the Minor Planets by Paul Herget in 1955. Lutz Schmadel quoted an excerpt of Kahrstedt's letter in his Dictionary of Minor Planet Names (LDS).

Physical characteristics 

In the SMASS classification, Gretia is a Sr-subtype that transitions between the common S-type and rare R-type asteroids.

Lightcurves 

Since 1997, a large number of rotational lightcurves of Gretia have been obtained from photometric observations. Analysis of the best-rated lightcurves gave a rotation period of 5.778 hours with a maximal brightness amplitude from 0.26 to 0.75 magnitude.

The asteroid's spin axis of (92.0°, 67.0°) and (247.0°, 48.0°) in ecliptic coordinates (λ, β) have also been derived from modeled lightcurves.

Diameter and albedo 

According to the surveys carried out by the Infrared Astronomical Satellite IRAS, the Japanese Akari satellite and the NEOWISE mission of NASA's Wide-field Infrared Survey Explorer, Gretia measures between 31.91 and 36.60 kilometers in diameter and its surface has a high albedo between 0.3566 and 0.4239.

The Collaborative Asteroid Lightcurve Link adopts the results obtained by IRAS, that is, an exceptionally high albedo of 0.4239 and a diameter of 31.91 kilometers with an absolute magnitude of 9.03.

References

External links 
 Asteroid Lightcurve Database (LCDB), query form (info )
 Dictionary of Minor Planet Names, Google books
 Asteroids and comets rotation curves, CdR – Observatoire de Genève, Raoul Behrend
 Discovery Circumstances: Numbered Minor Planets (1)-(5000) – Minor Planet Center
 
 

000984
Discoveries by Karl Wilhelm Reinmuth
Named minor planets
000984
19220827